Francisco Trois (3 September 1946 – 16 September 2020) was a Brazilian chess International Master and International Arbiter (1986). He was born in Canoas, and won the South American Chess Championship in 1978, in Tramandai, in the state of Rio Grande do Sul, Brazil. He qualified for the Riga Interzonal in 1979, but finished with a disappointing result of +2 =6 -9. His two victories from that tournament were against Florin Gheorghiu and Gennady Kuzmin. He represented Brazil in the Chess Olympiads in 1972, 1978 and 1982.

References

External links 
 
 

1946 births
2020 deaths
Brazilian chess players
Chess International Masters
Chess Olympiad competitors
Chess arbiters
People from Canoas